Television series whose first-run broadcasts were on multiple networks, which are listed in chronological order after each show name.

A
 Aawitan Kita (RPN, GMA, ABC)
 Adventures of the Gummi Bears (NBC, ABC, Syndication)
 Adyenda (ZOE TV, GMA, QTV, GMA News TV)
 Agila (RPN, ABS-CBN)
 Airwolf (CBS, USA)
 Aladdin (Disney Channel, Syndication, CBS)
 Alfred Hitchcock Presents (CBS, NBC)
 Alisto (GMA, GMA News TV)
 All Rise (CBS, OWN)
 All My Children (ABC, TOLN via Hulu)
 The Alvin Show (CBS, NBC as Alvin and the Chipmunks (1983), Nickelodeon as Alvin and the Chipmunks (2015))
 American Bandstand (WPVI-TV, ABC, Syndication, USA)
 American Dad! (FOX, TBS)
 America's Most Wanted (FOX, Lifetime)
 America's Next Top Model (UPN, The CW, VH1)
 American Idol (FOX, ABC)
 Ang Dating Daan (IBC, RPN, RJTV, PTV, SBN, UNTV)
 Ang Iglesia ni Cristo (MBS, PTV, RPN, IBC, BBC, City2, ABS-CBN, Net 25, GEM TV, INC TV)
 Ang Manok ni San Pedro (RPN, IBC)
 Ang Tamang Daan (SBN, Net 25, INC TV)
 Animaniacs (FOX, The WB, Hulu)
 Anna Luna (ABS-CBN, RPN)
 Archer (FX, FXX)
 Are You Afraid of the Dark? (YTV, Family Channel)
 Arrested Development (FOX, Netflix)
 Art Is Kool (GMA, ABC)
 The Arthur Murray Party (ABC, DuMont, CBS, NBC)
 Asenso Pinoy (ABC, IBC, NBN, PTV, Studio 23, S+A, A2Z)
 At Your Service (GMA, QTV as At Your Service-Star Power)
 Ating Alamin (MBS, PTV, IBC, ABC, NBN)

B
 Babylon 5 (PTEN, TNT)
 Bachelor Father (CBS, NBC, ABC)
 Batibot (RPN, PTV, ABS-CBN, GMA, TV5)
 BattleBots (Comedy Central, ABC, Science, Discovery)
 Battle of the Brains (RPN, PTV)
 Baywatch (NBC, Syndication)
 Beat the Clock (CBS, ABC, Syndication, PAX)
 Beetlejuice (ABC, FOX)
 The Berenstain Bears (CBS, PBS)
 The Betty White Show (KLAC-TV, NBC)
 Between Brothers (FOX, UPN)
 Big Brother: After Dark (Showtime 2, TVGN/Pop, Slice)
 Big Brother (Channel 4, Channel 5)
 Big Hero 6: The Series (Disney XD, Disney Channel)
 Bill & Ted's Excellent Adventures (CBS, FOX)
 Billboard Music Awards (FOX, ABC, NBC)
 The Bionic Woman (ABC, NBC)
 Bitag (ABC, IBC, TV5, PTV)
 Bitag Live (UNTV, AksyonTV, PTV)
 Biyaheng Langit (RPN, IBC, PTV, RJTV)
 Black Mirror (Channel 4, Netflix)
 Blockbusters (ITV, Sky1, BBC Two, Challenge)
 Bob the Builder  (Nickelodeon, PBS)
 Breaking the Magician's Code: Magic's Biggest Secrets Finally Revealed (FOX, MyNetwork TV)
 Brooklyn Nine-Nine (FOX, NBC)
 Brotherly Love (NBC, The WB)
 Buffy the Vampire Slayer (The WB, UPN)
 Business and Beyond (GMA News TV, PTV, IBC)
 Buzz Lightyear of Star Command (UPN, ABC)

C
 Cafeteria Aroma (ABS-CBN, RPN, GMA)
 Camp Candy (NBC, Syndication)
 Card Sharks (NBC, CBS, Syndication, ABC)
 Celebrity Big Brother (Channel 4 / E4, BBC One, Channel 5, 5Star)
 Celebrity Deathmatch (MTV, MTV2)
 Celebrity Family Feud (NBC, ABC)
 Charles in Charge (CBS, Syndication)
 The Chase (GSN, ABC)
 Chicks to Chicks (IBC, ABS-CBN as Chika Chika Chicks)
 Chikiting Patrol (ABS-CBN, IBC, GMA, ABC)
 The Chris Gethard Show (MNN, Fusion, TruTV)
 Cobra Kai (YouTube Red/YouTube Premium, Netflix)
 Coke Studio Philippines (TV5, ABS-CBN)
 Coney Reyes on Camera (RPN, ABS-CBN)
 Clueless (ABC, UPN)
 Cold Justice (TNT, Oxygen)
 Cougar Town (ABC, TBS)
 Columbo (NBC, ABC)
 The Critic (ABC, FOX)
 Community (NBC, Yahoo! View)

D
 Damages (FX, Audience Network)
 Damayan (ABS-CBN, GTV, MBS, PTV as Damayan Ngayon, NBN)
 Dancing with the Stars (ABC, Disney Plus)
 Danger Mouse (Thames, CBBC)
 The Danny Thomas Show (ABC, CBS)
 Darkwing Duck (Disney Channel, Syndication, ABC)
 The Dating Game (ABC, Syndication)
 Davis Rules (ABC, CBS)
 Dayaw (ANC, PTV)
 The Days and Nights of Molly Dodd (NBC, Lifetime)
 The Detective Starring Robert Taylor (ABC, NBC)
 Diff'rent Strokes (NBC, ABC)
 Diyos at Bayan (ZOE TV, Light TV, RPN, NBN, GMA, QTV, GMA News TV, A2Z)
 Doctor Who Confidential (BBC Three, BBC One, BBC Two Wales, BBC HD, BBC America, CBBC)
 Doraemon (NTV, TV Asahi)
 Double Dare (Nickelodeon, Syndication)
 Doug (Nickelodeon, ABC)
 Down You Go (DuMont, CBS, ABC, NBC)
 DuckTales (2017) (Disney XD, Disney Channel)
 The Dude Perfect Show (CMT, Nickelodeon)

E
 Eat Bulaga! (RPN, ABS-CBN, GMA)
 The Edge of Night (CBS, ABC)
 Eggheads (BBC One, BBC Two, Channel 5)
 The Ernie Kovacs Show (NBC, CBS, DuMont, ABC)
 Ethel and Albert (NBC, CBS, ABC)
 Everybody Hates Chris (UPN, The CW)
 The Expanse (Syfy, Amazon Prime Video)
 Expedition Wild (Nat Geo Wild, ABC, The CW)

F
 Family Double Dare (FOX, Nickelodeon)
 Family Feud (ABC, Syndication, CBS)
 Family Feud (ABC, GMA, ABS-CBN)
 Family Kuarta o Kahon (ABS-CBN, BBC, City2, RPN)
 Family Matters (ABC, CBS)
 Family TV Mass (IBC, GMA, 5 Plus, One Sports)
 Father Dowling Mysteries (NBC, ABC)
 Father Knows Best (CBS, NBC)
 Fear Factor (NBC, MTV)
 Final Space (TBS, Adult Swim)
 Finders Keepers (Nickelodeon, Syndication)
 For Your Love (NBC, The WB)
 Flashpoint (CBS, Ion)
 For Kids Only (ABS-CBN, RPN)
 Friday Night Lights (NBC, The 101 Network)
 Front Row (GMA News TV, GMA)
 Fudge (ABC, CBS)
 Fun House (Syndication, FOX)
 Futurama (FOX, Comedy Central, Hulu)

G
 The Game (The CW, BET)
 Gargoyles (Syndication, ABC)
 Get Smart (NBC, CBS)
 Getting By (ABC, NBC)
 The Ghost & Mrs. Muir (NBC, ABC)
 Gilmore Girls (The WB, The CW, Netflix)
 Girlfriends (UPN, The CW)
 God, the Devil and Bob (NBC, Adult Swim)
 Goin' Bananas (BBC, IBC, ABS-CBN)
 Goof Troop (Syndication, ABC)
 The Great British Bake Off (BBC Two, BBC One, Channel 4)
 Grounded for Life (FOX, The WB)
 Gulong ng Palad (BBC/RPN, ABS-CBN)

H
 Hallmark Hall of Fame (NBC, CBS, PBS, ABC, Hallmark Channel)
 Hazel (NBC, CBS)
 Healthline (ABC, IBC, PTV)
 Hercules (Syndication, ABC)
 The Hogan Family (NBC, CBS)
 Hole in the Wall (FOX, Cartoon Network)
 Hollywood Squares (NBC, Syndication)
 Hollywood Showdown (PAX, GSN)
 Home Movies (UPN, Adult Swim)
 The Hughleys (ABC, UPN)

I
 Infinity Train (Cartoon Network, HBO Max)
Interspecies Reviewers (Funimation, Critical Mass video)
In the Heat of the Night (NBC, CBS)
 In the House (NBC, UPN)
 Isumbong Mo Kay Tulfo (RPN, PTV)
It's a Living (ABC, Syndication)
 It's Always Sunny in Philadelphia (FX, FXX)

J
 The Jackie Gleason Show (DuMont as Cavalcade of Stars, CBS)
 JAG (NBC, CBS)
 The Jeff Foxworthy Show (ABC, NBC)
 Jeopardy! (NBC, Syndication)
 The Joey Bishop Show (NBC, CBS)

K
 Kagat ng Dilim (IBC, TV5)
 Kapag May Katwiran, Ipaglaban Mo! (IBC, ABS-CBN as Ipaglaban Mo!, GMA News TV as Kapag nasa Katwiran, Ipaglaban Mo!, Kapamilya Channel, A2Z)
 Kape at Balita (GMA, GMA News TV)
 Kasangga Mo ang Langit (RPN, IBC, PTV, RJTV)
 Kids Incorporated (Syndication, Disney Channel)
 Kids Say the Darnedest Things (CBS, ABC)
 Kids TV (RPN, ABC)
 Kidsongs (Syndication, PBS)
 The Killing (AMC, Netflix)

L
 Land of the Lost (NBC, ABC)
 Law & Order: Criminal Intent (NBC, USA)
 Last Man Standing (ABC, FOX)
 The Lawrence Welk Show (KTLA, ABC, Syndication, PBS)
 Leave It to Beaver (CBS, ABC)
 Let's Make a Deal (NBC, ABC, Syndication, CBS)
 Line of Duty (BBC Two, BBC One)
 The Lion Guard (Disney Channel, Disney Junior)
 Live with Kelly and Ryan (WABC-TV, Syndication)
 Longmire (A&E, Netflix)
 Loosely Exactly Nicole (MTV, Facebook)
 Love Connection (Syndication, FOX)
 Loveliness (ABS-CBN, IBC)
 Lovesick (Channel 4 as Scrotal Recall, Netflix)
 Lovingly Yours, Helen (GMA, BBC, City2)
 Lucifer (FOX, Netflix)

M
 Mad TV (FOX, The CW)
Magnum P.I. (CBS, NBC)
 Making the Band (ABC, MTV)
 Manifest (NBC, Netflix)
 Mary Kay and Johnny (DuMont, CBS, NBC)
 Match Game (NBC, CBS, Syndication, ABC)
 Matlock (NBC, ABC)
 May Bukas Pa (IBC, RPN)
 Medium (NBC, CBS)
 Men Behaving Badly (Thames, BBC One)
 The Message (ABS-CBN, IBC, INC TV)
 The Mickey Mouse Club (ABC, Syndicated, Disney Channel)
 Mickey and the Roadster Racers (Disney Channel, Disney Junior
 Mickey Mouse Clubhouse (Playhouse Disney, Disney Junior)
 The Mindy Project (FOX, Hulu)
 Minute to Win It (NBC, GSN)
 Miraculous: Tales of Ladybug & Cat Noir (Nickelodeon, Netflix, Disney Channel)
 Molang (Piwi+), (Canal+ Family), Disney Junior, Disney Channel)
 Monday Night Football (ABC, ESPN)
 Mongolian Barbecue (IBC, RPN)
 Monty Python's Flying Circus (BBC One, BBC Two)
 Morecambe and Wise (BBC, ATV, Thames)
 Motoring Today (IBC, PTV, NBN, Solar Sports)
 The Morey Amsterdam Show (CBS, DuMont)
 Mukha ng Buhay (PTV, RPN)
 Muppet Babies (CBS, Disney Junior)
 Muppets Tonight (ABC, Disney Channel)
 Murdoch Mysteries (Citytv, CBC)
 Mr. Ed (Syndication, CBS)
 My Three Sons (ABC, CBS)
 Mystery Science Theater 3000 (KTMA, The Comedy Channel, Comedy Central, Sci Fi, Netflix)

N
 The Naked Truth (ABC, NBC)
 Nashville (ABC, CMT)
 NBA Inside Stuff (NBC, ABC, NBA TV)
 The New Leave It to Beaver (Disney Channel, Superstation WTBS, Superstation TBS)
 The Newlywed Game (ABC, Syndication, GSN)
 Not So Late Night with Edu (GMA, ABS-CBN)

O
 Okay Ka, Fairy Ko! (IBC, ABS-CBN, GMA)
 On-Air (ABC, IBC)
 One Day at a Time (Netflix, Pop, TV Land)
 One Life to Live (ABC, TOLN via Hulu)
 One Tree Hill (The WB, The CW)
 The Original Amateur Hour (DuMont, ABC, NBC, CBS)
 The Outer Limits (Showtime, Syfy)

P
 Pangunahing Balita (ABC, PTV)
 Pantomime Quiz (CBS, NBC, DuMont, ABC)
 The Paper Chase (CBS, PBS, Showtime)
 Passions (NBC, The 101 Network)
 Philippines' Most Wanted (PTV, NBN, ABC)
 Phineas and Ferb (Disney Channel, Disney XD)
 The Pirates of Dark Water  (ABC, Syndication)
 The PJs (FOX, The WB)
 A Place to Call Home (Seven Network, Foxtel)
 Pokémon (Syndication, Kids WB, Cartoon Network, Disney XD, Netflix)
 Politically Incorrect (Comedy Central, ABC)
 Poltergeist: The Legacy (Showtime, Sci Fi)
 Power Rangers franchise (FOX, ABC, Toon Disney, Nickelodeon)
 The Price Is Right (NBC, ABC, CBS, Syndication)
 The Price Is Right (ABC, ABS-CBN)
 Probe (ABS-CBN, GMA as The Probe Team, ABC as The Probe Team Documentaries)
 Project Runway (Bravo, Lifetime)
 Public Forum (IBC, ABC)

R
 Realtree Outdoors (TNN, ESPN2, Outdoor Channel)
 Recipe Rehab (YouTube, ABC, CBS)
 The Red Green Show (CHCH-TV, Global, CBC)
 Regal Shocker (GMA, IBC, TV5)
 Reporter's Notebook (GMA, GMA News TV, GTV)
 The Ren & Stimpy Show (Nickelodeon, Spike TV as Ren & Stimpy "Adult Party Cartoon")
 Robot Wars (BBC Two, BBC One, BBC Choice, Channel 5)
 Rocky and His Friends (ABC, NBC as The Bullwinkle Show)
 Rock the Park (The CW, ABC)
 Roswell (The WB, UPN)
 RuPaul's Drag Race (Logo, VH1)

S
 Sabrina: The Animated Series (UPN, ABC)
 Sabrina the Teenage Witch (ABC, The WB)
 Sailor Moon (TV Asahi, Tokyo MX)
 Saturday Night's Main Event (NBC, FOX)
 Scooby-Doo (CBS, ABC, The WB, The CW, Cartoon Network, Boomerang)
 Scream (MTV, VH1)
 Scrubs (NBC, ABC)
 SEAL Team (CBS, Paramount+)
 Search for Tomorrow (CBS, NBC)
 Secret Millionaire (FOX, ABC)
 Second City Television (Global, CBC, Superchannel)
 See True (IBC, GMA)
 Sesame Street (NET, PBS, HBO, HBO Max)
 Shop 'til You Drop (Lifetime, The Family Channel, PAX)
 Side Stitch (ABC, RPN)
 Silk Stalkings (CBS, USA)
 Single (ABC, IBC)
 Sister, Sister (ABC, The WB)
 Sliders (FOX, Sci Fi)
 SmackDown Live (UPN, The CW, MyNetworkTV, Syfy, USA, FOX)
 Smallville (The WB, The CW)
 Something So Right (NBC, ABC)
 Southland (NBC, TNT)
 The Spectacular Spider-Man (The CW, Disney XD)
 Shaun the Sheep (CBBC, Netflix)
 Stargate SG-1 (Showtime, Sci Fi)
 Star vs. the Forces of Evil (Disney XD, Disney Channel)
 Step by Step (ABC, CBS)
 Student Canteen (ABS-CBN, GMA, RPN)
 Summer Camp Island (Cartoon Network, HBO Max)
 Supergirl (CBS, The CW)
 Super Games (IBC, GMA)
 The Super Hero Squad Show (Cartoon Network. The Hub)
 Super Sloppy Double Dare (Nickelodeon, Syndication)
 Supermarket Sweep (ABC, Lifetime, PAX; returned to ABC)
 Supernatural (The WB, The CW)

T
 T. J. Hooker (ABC, CBS)
 Tales from the Cryptkeeper (ABC, CBS as New Tales from the Cryptkeeper)
 TaleSpin (Disney Channel, Syndication)
 Taxi (ABC, NBC)
 Teamo Supremo (ABC, Toon Disney)
 The Basketball Show (ABC, RPN)
 The Kris Aquino Show (PTV, GMA)
 The Sharon Cuneta Show (IBC, ABS-CBN)
 Thomas & Friends (PBS Kids, Nick Jr.)
 Through the Keyhole (ITV, Sky1, BBC One, BBC Two)
 Tic-Tac-Dough (NBC, CBS, Syndication)
 Tierra Sangre (PTV, RPN)
 Tom Corbett, Space Cadet (CBS, ABC, NBC, DuMont)
 Torchwood (United Kingdom: BBC Three, BBC Two, BBC One; United States: Starz HD)
 Torchwood Declassified (BBC Three, BBC Two)
 The Tony Randall Show (ABC, CBS)
 Travel Time (IBC, GMA, Studio 23, ANC)
 Tropang Potchi (Q, GMA)
 Tuca & Bertie (Netflix, Adult Swim)
 Tunay na Buhay (GMA, GMA News TV, GTV)
 TV Nation (NBC, FOX)
 Twin Peaks (ABC, Showtime)

U
 Uncle Bob's Lucky 7 Club (GMA, RPN as Uncle Bob's Children's Show)
 Unforgettable (CBS, A&E)
 The United States Steel Hour (ABC, CBS)
 University Challenge (ITV, BBC Two)
 UnREAL (Lifetime, Hulu)
 Unsolved Mysteries (NBC, CBS, Lifetime, Spike, Netflix)
 Unwrapped 2.0 (Food Network, Cooking Channel)

V
 Vacation Creation (The CW, ABC)
 Valiente (ABS-CBN, GMA)
 Veronica Mars (UPN, The CW, Hulu)

W
 Wagon Train (NBC, ABC)
 Wander Over Yonder (Disney Channel, Disney XD)
 The Wayne Brady Show (ABC, Syndication)
 The Weakest Link (BBC Two, BBC One)
 The World Tonight (ABS-CBN, ANC, Kapamilya Channel)
 Wheel of Fortune (NBC, Syndication, CBS)
 Wheel of Fortune (ABC, ABS-CBN)
 Who Wants to Be a Millionaire? (IBC, TV5)
 Whose Line Is It Anyway? (Channel 4, ABC, ABC Family, The CW)
 Wild 'n Out (MTV, MTV2, VH1)
 Wilfred (FX, FXX)
 Winx Club (Rai 2, Rai Gulp)
 Wonder Woman (ABC, CBS)
 WWE Raw (USA, Spike TV)

Y
 You (Lifetime, Netflix)

#
 1 vs. 100 (NBC, GSN)
 101 Dalmatians: The Series (ABC, Syndication)
 2+2=4 (BBC, City2, PTV)
 21 Jump Street (FOX, Syndication)
 3R (Respect, Relax, Respond) (GMA, QTV, TV5)
 5 and Up (ABC, GMA)
 The 7D (Disney XD, Disney Channel, Disney Junior)

 
Revived